Birkenshaw is a village in the borough of Kirklees in the county of West Yorkshire, England. It lies at the crossroads between the A58 Leeds to Halifax road and the A651 Bradford to Heckmondwike road. At the 2011 census, the village was located in the ward of Birstall and Birkenshaw, which had a population 16,298. The name of the village derives from Old English and means "Birch Wood". Birkenshaw forms part of the Heavy Woollen District.

Birkenshaw is in the Bradford conurbation and the Bradford postcode area. Most landline telephones have the Bradford dialling code (01274), but some use the Leeds prefix (0113).

It is the site of the headquarters of the West Yorkshire Fire and Rescue Service.

Transportation
The village used to have a railway station on the former Leeds, Bradford and Halifax Junction Railway. It was closed to passengers in 1953 and closed completely in 1964.

Facilities
There are two schools in the village, Birkenshaw Primary School and BBG Academy, a church and two playgrounds.

The village has three pubs - The Golden Fleece, The Halfway House and The George IV – and one social club, Birkenshaw Liberal Club.

There are two restaurants, The Grand Cru. and Heath-field Farm.

This village also has some sporting teams such as the Birkenshaw Bluedogs (rugby league) and the Birkenshaw Bells (netball).

Location grid

Notable people

People from Birkenshaw:
Benjamin Lister (1850–1919), cricketer
Michael McGowan (born 1940), politician
Emanuel Scott (1834–1898), cricketer
Harry Turner (1879–1939), cricketer

References

External links

Villages in West Yorkshire
Geography of Kirklees